Revelation Perth International Film Festival began in 1997. Founded by Richard Sowada to showcase a large range of independent feature films, documentaries, short films, and experimental works, it runs every July in Perth, Western Australia and is regarded as one of the best independent film festivals in Australia.

History 
Revelation's roots are as an underground film festival started in the basement of the Greenwich Club in Perth, Western Australia. The 1997 Festival ran 24 September – 4 October. In addition to the Greenwich Club, events and screenings were held at the Luna, Picabar, and Kulcha theaters. Opening night at the Greenwich featured Beat movies, live jazz, and DJ Joe 19. Screenings included "Timothy Leary's Dead": (Paul Davids), "Bad Bugs Bunny" (Dennis Nyback),and "Beat America" (Bruce Connor, Kenneth Anger, etc.).

The festival has developed into a large cultural event, screening films at cinemas and nightclubs across the city. Revelation specialises in independent and documentary films. Since its inception the festival has grown in size and scope. Alongside film screenings, the festival also features special events, including collaborations with musicians providing live soundtrack scores, academic conferences on cinema and culture, and associated visual art exhibitions.

It is a tightly curated event that also includes international animations, short films, experimental works and hybrid styles. It annually receives around 400 entries from the international community and is programmed from a mix of these submitted and invited works.

From 2001 - 2008 the festival collaborated with SPLIF - Screening Perth's Local Independent Films - showcasing local independent films and short films as part of the festival.

In 2006 founder and festival director Richard Sowada began working at the Australian Centre for the Moving Image. Filmmaker, broadcaster and journalist Megan Spencer became program director for the 2007 festival.

Since 2008 Jack Sargeant, film theorist, author and curator, has programmed the event, maintaining its unique status amongst Australian film festivals. The festival has expanded each year, attracting wider acclaim and an increased international profile.

Since its inception Revelation has featured Australian premieres and films such as Sonic Outlaws directed by Craig Baldwin, Sick: The Life & Death of Bob Flanagan, Heavy Metal Parking Lot  by Jeff Krulik, WADD: The Life & Times of John C Holms, Divine Trash, Spellbound, One Hundred Mornings, Wheedle's Groove, Nude Study, Pictures of Superheroes  and cult movies such as Beat Girl, Pull My Daisy, Gimme Shelter, and Cigarette Girl.

The event has participated as a platform for a range of feature and documentary works that have gone on to attain theatrical, DVD or other on-going release and sales in Australia.  It also works actively with a range of major Australian screen culture events, organisations and festivals with guests, curated programs and individual titles.

Opening night films 

Opening Night Films have included:
2002: The Low Down (directed by Jamie Thraves);
2003: Gimme Shelter (directed by Albert and David Maysles and Charlotte Zwerin);
2004: Reconstruction (directed by Christoffer Boe);
2005: Kontroll (directed by Nimród Antal);
2006: Ambulance (directed by Laurits Munch-Petersen);
2007: Monkey Warfare (directed by Reginald Harkema);
2008: Island of Lost Souls (directed by Nikolaj Arcel);
2009: Sita Sings the Blues (directed by Nina Paley);
2010: Good Hair (directed by Jeff Stilson);
2011: Fire in Babylon (directed by Stevan Riley);
2012: Your Sister's Sister (directed by Lynn Shelton);
2013: Burn (directed by Tom Putnam and Brenna Sanchez);
2014: Under the Skin (directed by Jonathan Glazer);
2015: Last Cab to Darwin (directed by Jeremy Sims);
2016: Demolition (directed by Jean-Marc Vallée).

See also
Film Industry in Western Australia
Screen Australia
Cinema of Australia

References

External links 

abc.net.au/atthemovies ABC TV interview with Jack Sargeant
realtimearts.net Real Time article on 2009 event
 Interview with program director Jack Sargeant in Film Ink
 Interview with program director Jack Sargeant in Real Time

Film festivals established in 1997
Festivals in Perth, Western Australia
Film festivals in Australia
1997 establishments in Australia